Psoricoptera arenicolor is a moth of the family Gelechiidae. It was described by Omelko in 1999. It is found in the Russian Far East, where it has been recorded from south-eastern Siberia and Sakhalin.

References

Moths described in 1999
Psoricoptera